General elections were held in Azad Kashmir in 1990 to elect the members of fourth assembly of Azad Kashmir.

References

Elections in Azad Kashmir
1990 elections in Pakistan